This is a list of Hong Kong poets, both people born in Hong Kong or residing there. The list includes both Chinese language poets and poets writing in other languages.

Chinese language poets

Natalia Chan Siu Hung
Chen Zhide
Huang Yunru
Lau Tsz-wan
Ma Lang
Ou Waiou
Xi Xi
Yam Gong
Leung Ping-kwan

English language poets

Kit Fan, winner, HKU Poetry Prize 2010; winner, Times/Stephen Spender Prize 2006, finalist, The Times Literary Supplement Mick Imlah Poetry Prize 2017
Ho-cheung Lee, founding editor, BALLOONS Lit. Journal
Nashua Gallagher
Sayed Gouda
Louise Ho
Tammy Ho Lai-Ming, winner, 2015 Hong Kong Arts Development Council Young Artist Award (Literary Arts); founding co-editor, Cha: An Asian Literary Journal
Henrik Hoeg
Sarah Howe, winner, 2015 T. S. Eliot Prize
Alan Jefferies
Akin Jeje
Agnes Lam, Special Mention Award, 2009 Nosside International Poetry Prize
Madeleine Marie Slavick
Jennifer Wong, winner, 2013 Hong Kong Arts Development Council Young Artist Award (Literary Arts) 
Nicholas Wong, winner, 2016 Lambda Literary Award
Wiency Wong, winner, 2019, Hong Kong English Poetry Competition, RTHK

References

Lists of poets by nationality
Poets, list
 
English-language poets